Chthamalus hedgecocki is a species of star barnacle in the family Chthamalidae.

References

External links

 

Sessilia

Crustaceans described in 2007